Lionel Bailliu is a filmmaker best known for writing and directing his Academy Award-nominated 2002 short film Squash. According to the Internet Movie Database, Bailliu also wrote four episodes of the French T.V. series Élodie Bradford, a show he created in 2004. He also wrote and directed the 2000 film Microsnake, the 2005 compilation Selected Shorts #2: European Award Winners, and the 2006 film Fair Play.

References

External links 
Lionel Bailliu  at the Internet Movie Database
New York Times review of Fair Play 

Living people
French film directors
Year of birth missing (living people)